Regan Kelly (born 9 March 1981) is a Canadian former professional ice hockey defenceman. Kelly was born in Watrous, Saskatchewan, and raised in Imperial, Saskatchewan.

Draft 
Kelly was drafted 259th overall by the Philadelphia Flyers in the 2000 NHL Entry Draft but never played in the National Hockey League.

Career 
After turning pro from Providence College in 2002, he spent three seasons in the American Hockey League for the St. John's Maple Leafs.  He then moved to the United Hockey League with the Danbury Thrashers and also had a brief spell in the Elite Ice Hockey League in the United Kingdom for the Sheffield Steelers.

He then briefly played in Italy's Serie A league for Bolzano-Bozen before moving to the GET-ligaen in Norway, playing for Vålerenga and winning the championship. In 2007, Kelly returned to Italy, signing with the Hockey Club Junior Milano Vipers.

Awards and honors

Career statistics

References

External links

1981 births
Living people
Canadian ice hockey defencemen
Ice hockey people from Saskatchewan
Bolzano HC players
Danbury Trashers players
HC Milano players
Providence Friars men's ice hockey players
St. John's Maple Leafs players
Sheffield Steelers players
Vålerenga Ishockey players
Philadelphia Flyers draft picks
Serie A (ice hockey) players
Canadian expatriate ice hockey players in England
Canadian expatriate ice hockey players in Norway
Canadian expatriate ice hockey players in Italy